Shoemaker v. United States, 147 U.S. 282 (1893), was a landmark decision of the Supreme Court of the United States on the United States Constitution's Appointments Clause. The Court declared Congress may expand the duties of an existing office without rendering it necessary that the incumbent again be nominated, confirmed and appointed as long as the new duties are "germane" to those already held by the office.

See also 
 List of United States Supreme Court cases, volume 147

Notes and references

External links 
 

1893 in United States case law
United States Supreme Court cases
United States Supreme Court cases of the Fuller Court
Appointments Clause case law
United States administrative case law
United States separation of powers case law